This is a list of international trips made by Angela Merkel, the 8th Chancellor of Germany, since her assumption of office on 22 November 2005 to December 8, 2021, date of the election and investiture of Olaf Scholz, new chancellor.

Summary of international trips

2005

2006

2007

2008

2009

2010

2011

2012

2013

2014

2015

2016

2017

2018

2019

2020

2021

Notes

References

External links
The Chancellor's Official Website

Angela Merkel
Merkel
Trips
Merkel